The arrondissement of Saint-Brieuc is an arrondissement of France in the Côtes-d'Armor department in the Brittany region. It has 113 communes.

Composition

The communes of the arrondissement of Saint-Brieuc, and their INSEE codes, are:

 Allineuc (22001)
 Andel (22002)
 Binic-Étables-sur-Mer (22055)
 Le Bodéo (22009)
 La Bouillie (22012)
 Bréhand (22015)
 Le Cambout (22027)
 Caurel (22033)
 La Chèze (22039)
 Coëtlogon (22043)
 Coëtmieux (22044)
 Corlay (22047)
 Éréac (22053)
 Erquy (22054)
 Le Fœil (22059)
 Gausson (22060)
 Gomené (22062)
 Grâce-Uzel (22068)
 Guerlédan (22158)
 La Harmoye (22073)
 Le Haut-Corlay (22074)
 Hémonstoir (22075)
 Hénanbihen (22076)
 Hénansal (22077)
 Hénon (22079)
 Hillion (22081)
 Île-de-Bréhat (22016)
 Illifaut (22083)
 Jugon-les-Lacs-Commune-Nouvelle (22084)
 Lamballe-Armor (22093)
 Landéhen (22098)
 Lanfains (22099)
 Langueux (22106)
 Lanrelas (22114)
 Lantic (22117)
 Laurenan (22122)
 Le Leslay (22126)
 Loscouët-sur-Meu (22133)
 Loudéac (22136)
 La Malhoure (22140)
 La Méaugon (22144)
 Le Mené (22046)
 Merdrignac (22147)
 Mérillac (22148)
 Merléac (22149)
 Moncontour (22153)
 La Motte (22155)
 Noyal (22160)
 Penguily (22165)
 Plaine-Haute (22170)
 Plaintel (22171)
 Plédéliac (22175)
 Plédran (22176)
 Plémet (22183)
 Plémy (22184)
 Plénée-Jugon (22185)
 Pléneuf-Val-André (22186)
 Plérin (22187)
 Plestan (22193)
 Plœuc-l'Hermitage (22203)
 Ploufragan (22215)
 Plouguenast-Langast (22219)
 Plourhan (22232)
 Plumieux (22241)
 Plurien (22242)
 Plussulien (22244)
 Pommeret (22246)
 Pordic (22251)
 La Prénessaye (22255)
 Quessoy (22258)
 Le Quillio (22260)
 Quintenic (22261)
 Quintin (22262)
 Rouillac (22267)
 Saint-Alban (22273)
 Saint-Barnabé (22275)
 Saint-Bihy (22276)
 Saint-Brandan (22277)
 Saint-Brieuc (22278)
 Saint-Caradec (22279)
 Saint-Carreuc (22281)
 Saint-Connec (22285)
 Saint-Denoual (22286)
 Saint-Donan (22287)
 Saint-Étienne-du-Gué-de-l'Isle (22288)
 Saint-Gildas (22291)
 Saint-Gilles-Vieux-Marché (22295)
 Saint-Glen (22296)
 Saint-Hervé (22300)
 Saint-Julien (22307)
 Saint-Launeuc (22309)
 Saint-Martin-des-Prés (22313)
 Saint-Maudan (22314)
 Saint-Mayeux (22316)
 Saint-Quay-Portrieux (22325)
 Saint-Rieul (22326)
 Saint-Thélo (22330)
 Saint-Trimoël (22332)
 Saint-Vran (22333)
 Sévignac (22337)
 Tramain (22341)
 Trébry (22345)
 Trédaniel (22346)
 Trédias (22348)
 Trégueux (22360)
 Trémeur (22369)
 Trémorel (22371)
 Trémuson (22372)
 Trévé (22376)
 Tréveneuc (22377)
 Uzel (22384)
 Le Vieux-Bourg (22386)
 Yffiniac (22389)

History

The arrondissement Saint-Brieuc of was created in 1800. At the January 2017 reorganisation of the arrondissements of Côtes-d'Armor, it gained 25 communes from the arrondissement of Dinan and five communes from the arrondissement of Guingamp, and it lost 29 communes to the arrondissement of Guingamp.

As a result of the reorganisation of the cantons of France which came into effect in 2015, the borders of the cantons are no longer related to the borders of the arrondissements. The cantons of the arrondissement of Saint-Brieuc were, as of January 2015:

 Châtelaudren
 La Chèze
 Corlay
 Étables-sur-Mer
 Lamballe
 Langueux
 Lanvollon
 Loudéac
 Moncontour
 Paimpol
 Pléneuf-Val-André
 Plérin
 Ploeuc-sur-Lié
 Ploufragan
 Plouguenast
 Plouha
 Quintin
 Saint-Brieuc-Nord
 Saint-Brieuc-Ouest
 Saint-Brieuc-Sud
 Uzel

References

Saint-Brieuc